Knowlton Township School District is a community public school district in Knowlton Township, Warren County, New Jersey, United States, that serves students in pre-kindergarten through sixth grade.

As of the 2019–20 school year, the district, comprised of one school, had an enrollment of 155 students and 23.0 classroom teachers (on an FTE basis), for a student–teacher ratio of 6.7:1. In the 2016–17 school year, Knowlton had the 41st smallest enrollment of any school district in the state, with 192 students.

The district is classified by the New Jersey Department of Education as being in District Factor Group "FG", the fourth-highest of eight groupings. District Factor Groups organize districts statewide to allow comparison by common socioeconomic characteristics of the local districts. From lowest socioeconomic status to highest, the categories are A, B, CD, DE, FG, GH, I and J.

Students in seventh through twelfth grades for public school attend the North Warren Regional High School in Blairstown, a public secondary high school, serving students from the townships of Blairstown, Frelinghuysen, Hardwick and Knowlton. As of the 2019–20 school year, the high school had an enrollment of 752 students and 69.0 classroom teachers (on an FTE basis), for a student–teacher ratio of 10.9:1.

Schools
Knowlton Elementary School served 155 students in grades PreK-6, as of the 2019–20 school year.
Dana Carroll, Vice Principal

Administration
Core members of the district's administration are:
Jeannine DeFalco, Superintendent 
Michael Brennan, Business Administrator

Board of education
The district's board of education, comprised of seven members, sets policy and oversees the fiscal and educational operation of the district through its administration. As a Type II school district, the board's trustees are elected directly by voters to serve three-year terms of office on a staggered basis, with either two or three seats up for election each year held (since 2012) as part of the November general election. The board appoints a superintendent to oversee the district's day-to-day operations and a business administrator to supervise the business functions of the district.

References

External links
District web site

School Data for the Knowlton Township School District, National Center for Education Statistics
North Warren Regional School District

School Data for the North Warren Regional High School, National Center for Education Statistics

Knowlton Township, New Jersey
New Jersey District Factor Group FG
School districts in Warren County, New Jersey
Public elementary schools in New Jersey